Agriocnemis thoracalis  is a species of damselfly in the family Coenagrionidae,

There is little known about this species of damselfly. A note in the Australian Faunal Directory says: the holotype lacks the last four abdominal segments and the identity of the species is therefore uncertain. The holotype, a male specimen, is in the NHRM (Naturhistoriska Rijkmuseet, Sweden). It was collected from Cape York Peninsula, Queensland, Australia, during Eric Mjöberg's Swedish scientific expedition to Australia, 1910–1913, and described by Bror Yngve Sjöstedt in 1917.

References 

Coenagrionidae
Odonata of Australia
Insects of Australia
Taxa named by Yngve Sjöstedt
Insects described in 1917
Damselflies